The Sta. Lucia Lady Realtors are a professional women's volleyball club in the Premier Volleyball League. The team is owned by Sta. Lucia Realty and Development Corporation.

History
The team was formed in 2017 playing in the Philippine SuperLiga (PSL). This marked the return of the company, Sta. Lucia Realty and Development Corporation, to Philippine major league sports. The company's previous foray in major league sports was the Sta. Lucia Realtors professional basketball team, which played in the Philippine Basketball Association from 1993 to 2010.

In 2021, the Lady Realtors turned professional with its transfer to the Premier Volleyball League (PVL) and were able to compete in one conference. In December 2021, the team took a leave of absence from the PVL and released its coach and all its players due to "uncertainties" of the ongoing COVID-19 pandemic. Consequentially, the team will not be taking part in the 2022 season. It hopes to reactivate in 2023 when the situation improves.

Current roster
For 2021 PVL Open Conference

Head coach
  Eddieson Orcullo
Assistant Coach(es)
  Rene Dulay  
  Glenn Mar Enverga 
Team manager
  Rose Santos
| valign="top" |

Physical Therapist
  Tenorio K/Gomez G

 Team Captain
 Import
 Draft Pick
 Rookie
 Inactive
 Suspended
 Free Agent
 Injured

Position main 

The following is the Sta Lucia Lady Realtors roster in the: 2020 PSL Grand Prix Conference

Head coach
  Raymund Castillo
Assistant Coach(es)
  Edisson Orcullo
  Franz Damian
Team manager
  Rose Santos
| valign="top" |

Physical Therapist
  Enverga K/Gomez G

 Team Captain
 Import
 Draft Pick
 Rookie
 Inactive
 Suspended
 Free Agent
 Injured

Previous roster 

For the 2020 PSL Grand Prix Conference:

Head coach
  Raymund Castillo
Assistant Coach(es)
  Eddieson Orcullo
  Glenn Mar Enverga
Team manager
  Rose Santos
| valign="top" |

Physical Therapist
  Tenorio K/Gomez G

 Team Captain
 Import
 Draft Pick
 Rookie
 Inactive
 Suspended
 Free Agent
 Injured

For the 2019 PSL Grand Prix Conference:

Head coach
  Raymund Castillo
Assistant Coach(es)
  Eddieson Orcullo
  Glenn Mar Enverga
Team manager
  Rose Santos
| valign="top" |

Physical Therapist
  Tenorio K/Gomez G

 Team Captain
 Import
 Draft Pick
 Rookie
 Inactive
 Suspended
 Free Agent
 Injured

For the 2018 PSL Grand Prix Conference:

Head coach
  George Pascua
Assistant Coach(es)
  Eddieson Orculio
| valign="top" |

Team manager
  Rose Santos
Doctor
  Warren Sarmiento

 Team Captain
 Import
 Draft Pick
 Rookie
 Inactive
 Suspended
 Free Agent
 Injured

For the 2017 PSL Grand Prix Conference:Head coach  Jerry YeeAssistant Coach(es)  Michael Cariño
  Melvin Dumalaog
| valign="top" |Team manager  Rose SantosDoctor
  Warren Sarmiento
Physical Therapist
  Randel Lapuz

 Team Captain
 Import
 Draft Pick
 Rookie
 Inactive
 Suspended
 Free Agent
 Injured

Head coach
  Sammy Acaylar
Assistant Coach(es)
  Michael Cariño
  Melvin Dumalaog
| valign="top" |

Team manager
  Rose Santos
Physical Therapist
  Charmaine Baes

 Team Captain
 Import
 Draft Pick
 Rookie
 Inactive
 Suspended
 Free Agent
 Injured

For the 2017 PSL Invitational Cup:

Honors

Team 
Premier Volleyball League:

Philippine Superliga:

Individual

Team captains 
  Djanel Welch Cheng (2017)
  Pamela Tricia Lastimosa (2018 - 2019)
  Amanda Villanueva (2019)
  Shainah Joseph (2020)
  Rubie De Leon (2021)

Coaches 
 Michael Cariño (2017 Invitational)
 Sammy Acaylar (2017 All-Filipino)
 Jerry Yee (2017 Grand Prix)
 George Pascua (2018)
 Babes Castillo (2019)
 Eddieson Orcullo (2020–2021)
 Edgar Barroga (2021)

Imports 
Philippine Superliga:

See also 
 Sta. Lucia Realtors (PBA basketball team)
 Sta. Lucia Realtors (PCBL basketball team)

References 

Premier Volleyball League (Philippines)
Women's volleyball teams in the Philippines
Premier Volleyball League
2017 establishments in the Philippines
Volleyball clubs established in 2017